Romana Carén (born 2 January 1979) is an actress, writer/director and vocal coach from Austria.

Biography
After she had graduated from Camillo Sitte Höhere Technische Lehranstalt in structural engineering she studied law at the University of Vienna and astronomy at the University of Central Lancashire.

She was trained in acting at the Actor's Studio Pallas in Vienna and graduated with the Austrian State Diploma in Acting. To continue her education she went to London where she attended a course in contemporary drama at the Royal Academy of Dramatic Art.

Carén has been on stage since the age of eight, including at the Burgtheater and the Theater Drachengasse in Vienna.
Her first lead role was the title role in Alice in Wonderland.
Her film and TV credits include SOKO Donau, Tatort, Jud Süß - Film ohne Gewissen, directed by Oskar Roehler, Sisi, directed by Xaver Schwarzenberger and The Pillars of the Earth with Donald Sutherland.

She has written several plays, screenplays and poems.
The play Glückskämpfer had its world premiere in 2007 in Vienna, Wintervögel in 2010 and Sein oder nicht sein in 2011.

Later she enrolled at the London Film Academy and graduated in Filmmaking with distinction.
Together with some of her co-students she founded the production company Film´84 International  to produce short and feature films as well as commercials. Their first short film in 2011, Make a Wish, was in the catalogue of the Short Film Corner of the Cannes Film Festival 2011.

Her short film screenplay Where the Wild Roses Grow was a semi-finalist in the 22nd WriteMovies.com International Writing Competition. Later it was screened in the Short Film Corner of the Cannes Film Festival 2012.

Filmography

Theatre

References

External links 
 
 

1979 births
Living people
Austrian film actresses
Austrian film directors
Austrian women film directors
Vocal coaches
Writers from Vienna
Austrian stage actresses
German-language film directors
Australian women dramatists and playwrights
20th-century Austrian dramatists and playwrights
21st-century Austrian dramatists and playwrights